Club Voleibol Torrelavega, also known as CV Cantabria Deporte for sponsorship reasons, is a Spanish women's volleyball club from Torrelavega currently playing in the Spanish second tier. Founded in 1966 in the city's Marqués de Santillana high school, it made its debut in the premier national championship in 1975 and in the next years it rose to the top positions; it was the championship's runner-up in 1977 and 1978, and in 1979 it won both the championship and the national cup, which was successfully defended the following year. It was the first team to represent Spain in the European Cup.

Torrelavega declined through the 1980s, but it remained in the premier championship until in 1999 it had to ask to be relegated for financial reasons. Its last major success was reaching its fourth cup final in 1995. In 2000 and 2008 it was promoted, but it had to renounce for the same reasons. In 2010 it finally returned to the Superliga, but after two seasons it was forced to withdraw again.

Titles
 Superliga Femenina (1)
 1979 
 Copa de la Reina (2)
 1979, 1980

Season to season

2012-13 squad
 (1.84)  Ana González
 (1.84)  Aroa Sánchez
 (1.79)  Paula del Olmo
 (1.78)  María Segovia
 (1.75)  Susana García
 (1.73)  Sandra Villegas
 (1.72)  Isabel Díaz
 (1.72)  Noelia Neila
 (1.68)  Lidia Dacuiña
 (1.65)  Alba Hoyas
 (1.63)  Laura Soto
 (1.62)  Ana Salazar

References

External links
Official website

Sports teams in Cantabria
Volleyball clubs established in 1966
Spanish volleyball clubs
1966 establishments in Spain